Colin Riley McMillan (July 27, 1935 – July 24, 2003) was a United States Assistant Secretary of Defense under President George H. W. Bush during the Gulf War. He was awaiting confirmation as United States Secretary of the Navy in 2003 when he died from an apparently self-inflicted gunshot wound in the head at his New Mexico ranch.

McMillan was the chairman and CEO of Permian Exploration Corporation, an oil exploration company, the chairman of the First Federal Savings Bank in Roswell, New Mexico, and the founder and CEO of McMillan Production Company.  He was appointed in 2001 to be the chairman of the Sallie Mae Corporation by President George W. Bush.

McMillan earned his bachelor's degree in geology from the University of North Carolina in 1957. He served in the United States Marine Corps from 1957 to 1960 and in the Marine Corps Reserve from 1960 to 1972, attaining the rank of major.

McMillan served in the New Mexico House of Representatives from 1971 to 1982. He ran for the United States Senate seat in New Mexico in 1994 but lost to incumbent Democrat Jeff Bingaman by a 54% to 46% margin. In 2000, McMillan was the New Mexico state chairman of George W. Bush's presidential campaign.

McMillan was survived by his wife, Kay, four children, and eight grandchildren.

References

1935 births
2003 deaths
Republican Party members of the New Mexico House of Representatives
United States Department of Defense officials
American chief executives
United States Marine Corps officers
University of North Carolina at Chapel Hill alumni
American politicians who committed suicide
Suicides by firearm in New Mexico
2003 suicides
George H. W. Bush administration personnel
United States Marine Corps reservists